Triphenylethylene (TPE) is a simple aromatic hydrocarbon that possesses weak estrogenic activity. Its estrogenic effects were discovered in 1937. TPE was derived from structural modification of the more potent estrogen diethylstilbestrol, which is a member of the stilbestrol group of nonsteroidal estrogens.

TPE is the parent compound of a group of nonsteroidal estrogen receptor ligands. It includes the estrogens chlorotrianisene, desmethylchlorotrianisene, estrobin (DBE), M2613, triphenylbromoethylene, triphenylchloroethylene, triphenyliodoethylene, triphenylmethylethylene; the selective estrogen receptor modulators (SERMs) afimoxifene, brilanestrant, broparestrol, clomifene, clomifenoxide, droloxifene, endoxifen, etacstil, fispemifene, idoxifene, miproxifene, miproxifene phosphate, nafoxidine, ospemifene, panomifene, and toremifene. The antiestrogen ethamoxytriphetol (MER-25) is also closely related, but is technically not a derivative of TPE and is instead a triphenylethanol derivative. The tamoxifen metabolite and aromatase inhibitor norendoxifen is also a TPE derivative. In addition to their estrogenic activity, various TPE derivatives like tamoxifen and clomifene have been found to act as protein kinase C inhibitors.

The affinity of triphenylethylene for the rat estrogen receptor is about 0.002% relative to estradiol. For comparison, the relative binding affinities of derivatives of triphenylethylene were 1.6% for tamoxifen, 175% for afimoxifene (4-hydroxytamoxifen), 15% for droloxifene, 1.4% for toremifene (4-chlorotamoxifen), 0.72% for clomifene, and 0.72% for nafoxidine.

See also
 List of SERMs
 Benzothiophene – parent compound for another group of nonsteroidal SERMs that includes raloxifene
 Phenanthrene – parent compound of steroidal estrogens like estradiol
 Chrysene – parent compound of a group of nonsteroidal weak estrogens that includes 2,8-DHHHC and tetrahydrochrysene
 Doisynolic acid – parent compound of a group of nonsteroidal estrogens that includes doisynoestrol
 Allenolic acid – parent compound of a group of nonsteroidal estrogens that includes methallenestril

References

Selective estrogen receptor modulators
Synthetic estrogens